Razzaq Ahmed (born 1 July 1944) is a former Iraqi football forward who played for Iraq in the 1972 AFC Asian Cup qualification. 

Kamil played for the national team between 1970 and 1974.

Career statistics

International goals
Scores and results list Iraq's goal tally first.

References

Iraqi footballers
Iraq international footballers
Living people
Association football forwards
1944 births